Cma Sampo Spa  is a joint venture company specializing in the development of agricultural vehicles. It was created in 2010 after an agreement between the Algerian brand Cma and the Finnish group Sampo-Rosenlew. It is based in Sidi Bel Abbès, owned by the company Construction Agricultural Equipment (CMA) and the Algerian firm for agricultural equipment manufacturing Pmat (62%) and Finnish partners (38%).

Products
The factory is producing several machines.
Sampo 2045

References

External links
http://www.sampo-rosenlew.fi/en/home.html
http://formin.finland.fi/public/default.aspx?contentid=273024&contentlan=1&culture=fi-FI
https://www.youtube.com/watch?v=X_WMcq8RYgo

Vehicle manufacturing companies established in 2010
Government-owned companies of Algeria
2010 establishments in Algeria